Nocardioides pacificus is a Gram-positive, aerobic, rod-shaped and non-motile bacterium from the genus Nocardioides which has been isolated from deep sub-seafloor sediments from the South Pacific Gyre.

References

External links
Type strain of Nocardioides pacificus at BacDive -  the Bacterial Diversity Metadatabase	

pacificus
Bacteria described in 2014